Siko is the second largest populated village in eastern Odisha, India. It has a mixed, rich culture mainly consisting of Hindus and Muslims, with Hindus making up a majority. Ardent nationalists from Siko participated in the Paika rebellion of 1817. Today, some "Paika akhada" are found in Siko. They display their warrior acts in various festivals.

Geographical location 
Siko is located in the Khordha district of Odisha, India. It is connected by a  section of NH-16 to New Jagannath Road. Road transport is the only mode of transportation to this village.

Education 
Being situated in a rural area, schools in Siko are run by the government. Most of the teachers are natives. Siko has one co-educational high school and one girls' high school. A new college was established in 2014 for higher secondary education andt provides intermediate-level courses in the arts. There is also a private school named Sri Aurobindo Interegal Education Centre.

Villages in Khordha district